Dewey is a ghost town in along the Colorado River in southeastern Grand County, Utah, United States.

Description
Originally named Kingsferry, it began in the 1880s when Samuel King built and operated a ferry across the Colorado River (but then known as the Grand River) at its confluence with the Dolores River. A small community soon developed around the ferry, although it never grew large. The town served as a ferry crossing until the Dewey Bridge was constructed in 1916.

See also

 List of ghost towns in Utah

References

External links

Ghost towns in Grand County, Utah
Populated places established in the 1880s